Adam Samuel Goldman is a Los Angeles–based composer, music producer, and artist. He is best known as songwriter and producer for the art-pop band Fol Chen, which released three albums on Sufjan Stevens's Asthmatic Kitty label from 2009 to 2013 and was noted for its "instantly unique blend of dread and whimsy." He was songwriter and singer for chamber pop band Bedroom Walls and touring guitarist for Liars on their 2008 tour opening for Radiohead. Goldman has produced albums for Andrew Bird and Simone White, remixed songs by Junior Vasquez and David Bowie, and covered Prince for Spin magazine. He is composer for the CBS primetime drama The Code.

Film and Television 
In 2019, Goldman began scoring the CBS military-legal drama The Code, created by Craig Sweeny and Craig Turk. He scored the documentary film Knock Knock, It's Tig Notaro for Showtime and co-wrote the score to Patrik-Ian Polk's feature film Noah's Arc: Jumping the Broom, as well as providing songs for the Noah’s Arc television series on Logo TV. He has twice scored nonfiction projects for director Lauren Greenfield, including Beauty CULTure (co-written with Julian Wass as Fol Chen), commissioned by the Annenberg Space for Photography. Goldman's songs have been used in the television shows Weeds (Showtime), CSI:NY (CBS), Elementary (CBS), The Mindy Project (FOX), This American Life (Showtime), The 4400 (USA Network) and One Nation Under Dog (HBO). Goldman's commercial work includes music composed for Visa, Hyundai, and Canon.

Music Production 
Goldman produced Andrew Bird’s Echolocations: River (2017), which was described by AllMusic as “darkly enchanting” and “a wholly unique experience, fusing ambient improvisations with chamber music and environmental soundscapes.” He co-wrote and co-produced Silver Silver (2012), an album by Simone White, released on Damon Albarn’s Honest Jon’s imprint.

Under his Fol Chen pseudonym Samuel Bing, Goldman remixed Junior Vasquez’s “Insecurities” for release on the Tommy Boy label in 2009. That same year, he produced a cover of Prince’s “The Beautiful Ones” for Spin magazine’s Purplish Rain tribute album. He teamed up with KCRW disc jockey Eric J. Lawrence to remix David Bowie’s “Golden Years” as part of a deluxe reissue of Bowie’s Station To Station album.

Art 
For the 2017 Dunedin Fringe Festival in New Zealand, Goldman organized Anything Could Happen with key figures from the Dunedin Sound music scene including Roy Colbert of Records Records, Alastair Galbraith, and members of Straitjacket Fits, The Chills, Look Blue Go Purple, The Verlaines, and The Bats. He has collaborated with Machine Project on performances and projects at the Walker Art Center, LACMA, Colgate University. In 2011, Goldman and Fol Chen collaborated with Monome on "a crazy motion-sensitive musical pyramid" sound toy called The Tetrafol.

Goldman studied film at California Institute of the Arts. His 1998 documentary The Mark Twain Company, which examined the estate of Samuel L. Clemens, screened at MoMA, Los Angeles Filmforum, and Other Cinema in San Francisco. The film was described as “a fascinating and revealing portrait of the insidious workings of capitalist enterprise.”

Discography
Fol Chen 
The False Alarms (2013) 
Part II: The New December (2010) 
 The Holograms (EP) 
 In Ruins (EP) 
Part I: John Shade, Your Fortune's Made (2009)

Bedroom Walls
All Good Dreamers Pass This Way (2006) 
I Saw You Coming Back To Me (2003)

References

American film score composers
21st-century American male singers
21st-century American singers
Musicians from Los Angeles
Living people
1971 births
Colgate University alumni
California Institute of the Arts alumni
Singers from New York (state)
People from Syosset, New York
American television composers
Male television composers